The Šešupė is a 298 km long river that flows through Poland (27 km), Lithuania (158 km), and Russia (62 km).  The river flows for 51 km along the border between the Kaliningrad Oblast, an exclave of Russia, and Lithuania.  The Šešupė originates near the Polish town of Szeszupka, about 10 miles from the Polish-Lithuanian border, and flows into the Nemunas near the town of Neman on the border between Lithuania and Kaliningrad Oblast.

Major towns and cities along the river, from the Nemunas to the source, are:  Kudirkos Naumiestis, Pilviškiai, Marijampolė and Kalvarija.

There are parts of Kaliningrad and Lithuania that are on the opposite side of the river, including a small island that is mostly Russian but has an area belonging to Lithuania.

It is the fourth-longest river in Lithuania.

Etymology of the name Šešupė is not exactly clear. Upė means river in Lithuanian. The root "šeš-" most probably originates from the word "sausa" meaning "dry", i.e. the dry river ("sausupė"). There is also the association with the word šeši which means number six in Lithuania, and the river name could be understood "river of six" or just "sixriver", but most likely etymology is that part of the name "šeš" derived from the term šėšėlis meaning shadow, and the river name itself could be translated as a "shadow river".

References

Rivers of Lithuania
Rivers of Poland
Rivers of Podlaskie Voivodeship
Rivers of Kaliningrad Oblast
International rivers of Europe
Lithuania–Russia border